Lunnon is an English surname and may refer to 

James Lunnon (1897–1954), an English-born artist and engineer who worked in the US
James Lunnon (trade unionist) (1869–1952), an English trade unionist and political activist.
Jane Lunnon (born 1969), an English schoolteacher, head of Alleyn's School

Surnames of English origin